James G. Nunn is an active bishop in the United Methodist Church, the second largest Protestant denomination in the United States.

Biography and Education

James (Jimmy) Nunn graduated from McMurry University with a Bachelor of Arts (B.A.) degree, and he graduated from Asbury Theological Seminary with a Master of Divinity (M.Div.) degree. He also received a Doctor of Ministry (D.Min.) degree from Asbury Theological Seminary.

Nunn was ordained in the Northwest Texas Conference as a United Methodist Deacon in 1980 and as a United Methodist Elder in 1983.

Episcopal Service
Nunn was elected to the episcopacy in 2016 and assigned to the Oklahoma Episcopal Area comprising the Oklahoma Conference and the Oklahoma Indian Missionary Conference.

See also
 List of bishops of the United Methodist Church

References

External links
 http://www.umc.org/bishops/bishop-james-g-jimmy-nunn  Official biography from the Council of Bishops
 https://www.okumc.org/
 http://www.umc-oimc.org/

Living people
American United Methodist bishops
21st-century Methodist ministers
20th-century Methodist ministers
Year of birth missing (living people)
20th-century American clergy
21st-century American clergy